The men's competition in the middleweight   (– 77 kg) division was staged on November 24, 2009.

Schedule

Medalists

Records

Results

New records

References
Results 

- Mens 77 kg, 2009 World Weightlifting Championships